Giovanni Gussone (8 February 1787, Villamaina – 14 January 1866, Naples) was an Italian academic and botanist, remembered for his work in plant taxonomy and in particular his research in Sicilian flora.

He studied medicine in Naples, where he came under the influence of botanist Michele Tenore. Following graduation in 1811, he worked under Tenore as a manager of the Orto Botanico di Napoli (botanical garden in Naples). In 1817 he moved to Sicily, where he was appointed director of the botanical garden at Boccadifalco, outside of Palermo. In Sicily, he conducted extensive investigations of the island's flora, publishing two major works as a result, "Florae Siculae Prodromus" and "Florae Siculae Synopsis". In 1827 he returned to Naples as superintendent of the botanical gardens. In 1861 he was named by Victor Emmanuel as professor emeritus of the University of Naples.

Plants with the specific epithet of gussonei are named in his honor, an example being Petagnaea gussonei.

Written works 
 "Plantae rariores" (1826).
 "Florae siculae prodromus" (1827-1828).
 "Flora sicula" (1829).
 
 
 
 "Enumeratio plantarum vascularium in insula Inarime" (1855).

References 

1787 births
1866 deaths
19th-century Italian people
Academic staff of the University of Naples Federico II
19th-century Italian botanists
People from the Province of Avellino
University of Naples Federico II alumni